Petworth Park at Petworth, Sussex was used as the venue for three first-class cricket matches between 1824 and 1826. The ground was in front of the main house, before the cricket ground was moved to its current location nearby at Petworth Park New Ground.

References

1785 establishments in England
Petworth
Cricket grounds in Sussex
Defunct cricket grounds in England
Defunct sports venues in West Sussex
English cricket venues in the 18th century
History of Sussex
Sports venues completed in 1785